Swathi Chinukulu is a 1989 Indian Telugu-language drama film directed by Sri Chakravarthy for producer T. Prasad and Kanta Rao, starring Vanisri, Ramya Krishnan, Sarath Babu, Suresh and Jayasudha.

Plot

Cast
Vanisri
Ramya Krishnan
Suresh
Jayasudha
Sarath Babu

Soundtrack

The music composed by Ilaiyaraaja.

Reception 
Griddaaluru Gopalrao writing for Zamin Ryot on 18 August 1989, opined that though the director has come up with a new storyline, the film overall fails to create magic.

Awards 
Nandi Awards
 1989 - Best Supporting Actress - Jayasudha

References

External links

1989 films
1980s Telugu-language films
Films scored by Ilaiyaraaja